The Cruzeros are a Canadian country rock band from Kelowna, British Columbia. Their concert lineup includes main songwriter and lead vocalist Barry Mathers on guitar and mandolin, Curtis Tulman on vocals, guitar, harmonica and saxophone, Jim Ryan on vocals and bass, songstress Rachel Matkin on vocals and mandolin, Jay Terrence on drums, Gary Smyth on lead guitar and Rod Miller on keys and accordion.

History
The Cruzeros were formed by Mathers and Tulman in 1985 under the name Sea Cruise. They played top forty cover tunes on the pub and nightclub circuit in Canada's BC Interior. They began writing and recording their own songs later that year and for the next decade home-produced singles which were played on local radio and television through videos produced by the BC Music Project. The band went on a tour of Mexico, and subsequently changed the name to The Cruzeros. During this time the band members settled in Kelowna and began raising families.

In 1995 the band received funding through FACTOR to produce an album, which they did with Vancouver producer Bill Buckingham. The self-titled album was released to radio in 1996. It was played nationally, and its success earned them a 1977 JUNO nomination for Country Group of the Year.

During the next 13 years they launched three albums independently, which spawned a total of 20 top forty hits on the national country charts, eight videos on CMT and a number of award citations, including a Canadian Indy for Country Album of the Year, CCMA Special Instrumentalist of the Year three years running and BCCMA Group, Songwriter and Album of the Year awards.

The band performed about 150 concerts per year across Canada, with forays into the United States, Mexico and Europe.

The Cruzeros retired from active touring in 2008; they have appeared a few times locally since then to perform at a benefit concert or special event. Mathers continues to produce and engineer from his home studio, Redhouse Recording and has joined with Matkin to form the rootsy Dirt Road Opera. Tulman heads the worship department for the Willow Park Church Network and joins Smyth and Miller in the eclectic gypsy jazz group Cowboy Bob. Ryan works as a studio musician who is regularly called to recording sessions in Vancouver, Toronto and Nashville. Terrance continues to perform locally.

Discography

Albums

Singles

Music videos

References

External links
Official Homepage

Canadian country music groups
Canadian country rock groups
Musical groups from Kelowna
1960 establishments in British Columbia